Bolesław Limanowski (18 October 1835 – 15 February 1935) was a Polish socialist politician, as well as historian and journalist and advocate of Agrarianism. He was one of the first people to promote socialist ideas in Poland.

Political activism
He began to be politically active during his studies in Wilno and was arrested by Russian police in 1861 for expressing patriotic views. He was still in prison, when the January Uprising began in 1863, so he couldn't take part in the fighting. Released from prison in 1867, he moved to Lviv, where he was working as a journalist, expressing socialist views and became the secretary to Rudolf Günsberg, Professor of Applied Chemistry for one year. In 1878 he emigrated to Switzerland, where he was publishing, together with Stanisław Mendelson, K. Dłuski and K. Hildt, one of the first Polish socialist newspaper, "Równość" (Equality). He was a founder of Stowarzyszenie Socjalistyczne Lud Polski (Socialist Association "Polish People"), which goal was fighting for independence of Poland and socialism. His views were supported by Friedrich Engels himself, who opted for Polish independence (but changed his mind afterwards), and with whom Limanowski was in contact.

In November 1892 he took part in a meeting of Polish socialists from the Russian partition held in Paris. As the oldest participant, he became a chairman of the talks. He became one of the founding members of the Polish Socialist Party (PPS) established there. After the division of the Party, he supported Polish Socialist Party – Revolutionary Faction, led by Józef Piłsudski. Limanowski was a proponent of the Polish nation and never accepted internationalism of the radical left-wing organizations and communists.

Senator of independent Poland
He was present in Poland during the difficult first years of independence. In 1922 he was elected a senator for the first time. After Piłsudski's coup in 1926, Limanowski strongly advocated democracy and opposed the Sanacja authoritarian government. Despite his age, he remained active and was serving as a senator until his death at the age of 99.

Political thought

Bolesław Limanowski was the first Polish socialist writer and political thinker. In his works, he always expressed that the main goal of every Polish political party is to regain independence. He saw a strong connection between a struggle for nation sovereignty and social reforms. As a historian, he focused his attention especially on Poland during and after the times of partitions – national uprisings, revolutions and development of modern political thought and political parties. For his achievements on that field, he was awarded the title of doctor honoris causa of the University of Warsaw in 1934.

Agrarianism
Though not his party's official spokesman on agrarian matters, he thought deeply about Agrarianism and worked out an eclectic program that fit Polish conditions. His practical experience as a farm manager combined with socialist, "single-tax," and Slavic communal ideas shaped his world view. He proposed a form of agrarian socialism with large state farms to counteract the inefficiency of very small holdings. In independent Poland he advocated expropriation of gentry estates. His observation of with peasant individualism convinced him that Poland should combine voluntary collectivism and individual possession of the leased land. His pragmatism left room even for private peasant ownership, despite his Marxism.

Works 
 O kwestii robotniczej (On Workers' Issue) (1871)
 Historia demokracji polskiej w epoce porozbiorowej (The history of Polish democracy in the after-partitions period) (1901)
 Demokracja w Polsce (Democracy in Poland) (1903)
 Emilia Plater (1910)
 Studwudziestoletnia walka narodu polskiego o niepodległość (The 120 Years Fight of the Polish Nation for Independence) (1916)
 Rozwój polskiej myśli socjalistycznej (Progress of Polish Socialist Thought) (1929)
 Pamiętniki (Memoirs) (1961)

Footnotes

References

Further reading
 K. J. Cottam, "Boleslaw Limanowski, A Polish Theoretician of Agrarian Socialism," Slavonic and East European Review, Jan 1973, Vol. 51 Issue 122, pp 58–74

1835 births
1935 deaths
People from Braslaw District
People from Vitebsk Governorate
People from the Russian Empire of Polish descent
Polish Socialist Party – Revolutionary Faction politicians
Polish Socialist Party politicians
Senators of the Second Polish Republic (1922–1927)
Senators of the Second Polish Republic (1928–1930)
Senators of the Second Polish Republic (1930–1935)
20th-century Polish historians
Polish male non-fiction writers
Polish exiles in the Russian Empire
Commanders of the Order of Polonia Restituta
Recipients of the Cross of Independence